William Whitmore may refer to:

 William Whitmore (died 1648) (1572–1648), English landowner and politician
 Sir William Whitmore, 2nd Baronet (1637–1699), English politician
 William Whitmore (died 1725), MP for Bridgnorth 1705–10 and 1713–25
 William Whitmore (British Army officer) (1714–1771), MP for Bridgnorth 1741–7 and 1754–71
 William Elliott Whitmore (born 1978), American blues singer and musician
 William Henry Whitmore (1836–1900), Boston businessman, politician and genealogist
 William Henry Whitmore (1875-1918), Unknown marine of Padstow

See also
 William Wolryche-Whitmore (1787–1858), Shropshire landowner and British Whig politician